Mogadalapadu is a village near Kalingapatnam in Srikakulam district, India.

References

Villages in Srikakulam district